The yellowmargin triggerfish, pineapple trigger, yellowface triggerfish or yellow-face triggerfish (Pseudobalistes flavimarginatus) is a marine fish in the family Balistidae.

They are marketed either fresh or dried for food, but are potentially dangerous in some areas due to ciguatera poisoning.

The yellowmargin triggerfish is oviparous, spawning in pairs. The female fish guards the nests aggressively. When not mating, this fish is solitary or may remain in pairs.

See also
List of marine aquarium fish species

References 

Myers, R.F., 1991. Micronesian reef fishes. Second Ed. Coral Graphics, Barrigada, Guam. 298 p

External links
 

Balistidae
Fish of Thailand
Fish of Palau
Taxa named by Eduard Rüppell
Fish described in 1829